Manuel Mathieu (born October 1986) is a contemporary visual artist best known as a painter of abstract works that often evoke figurative shapes in nondescript environments. Mathieu draws from Haitian visual cultures and from Western art movements such as expressionism and existentialism. His practice weaves together formal techniques, Haitian contemporary art movements to explore phenomenologies of human relations as they relate to power dynamics, loyalty, love, nature, subjective experience, history writing.
His subjects matters start as personal concerns that he embeds into larger collective contexts.

Early life and education

Manuel Mathieu was born Ayizan Pierre Manuel Mathieu on October 9, 1986, in Port-au-Prince, Haiti. Both his parents are Haitian and raised their children with high expectations of educational achievements. His father Philippe Mathieu is an agronomist while his mother has a Phd in psychology. He has two younger sisters that both reside in Canada. 
When he was 15, he got closer to his cousin and groundbreaking Haitian artist Mario Benjamin. He often went to his house, a space full of magazines, art catalogues, and sculptures. There, at Benjamin’s house, he became acquainted with artists that influenced his own work, trailblazers such as Mona Hatoum and Clyfford Still. Benjamin shared his own approach to his artistic practice, which is very specific to his environment, while still being critical of Haitian socio-politics.

When he was 19, Mathieu moved to Quebec, into his grandmother's house who had emigrated to Canada with her children, without her husband, a colonel under Jean Claude Duvalier's dictatorial regime.

His parents associated Mathieu's artistic exploration to his struggles. When he moved to Blainville, Quebec, he began painting, as well as doing photography and video art more intensely with the support of his grandmother.

In 2016, he obtained a Master of Fine Arts at Goldsmiths, University of London, in England. Since his graduation, Manuel has become a sought-after artist with international representation by art galleries Kavi Gupta in Chicago, USA, Maruani Mercier in Brussels, Belgium, and HDM gallery in Beijing, China and London, United Kingdom.

Artistic influence and style

In 2015, one year into his postgraduate program at Goldsmiths, Mathieu was involved in a near-fatal motorbike hit-and-run. He suffered a severe concussion, facial trauma, fractures of his jaw, and short-term memory loss. This experience influenced the subject of his MFA thesis show “One future.” After his physical recovery and no more visible traces of his accident, he wanted to express what lingered innately. He found a correlation between his invisible trauma and that of his country after the Duvalier dictatorship. “One Future” explored the Duvalier regime in order to address the national trauma that was scarcely being addressed in collective settings. The accident also drew him closer to his family and consolidated his friendships. Many of Manuel’s portraits are of his immediate circle.

Deconstructive processes shape the overarching themes of Mathieu’s work, as he develops an visual language that pushes the confines of representational depictions and what is considered figurative. He extrapolates abstract formal techniques to portray historical Haitian figures and subject matters, creating a visual language that indicates his point-of-view through interpretative considerations. The textural, compositional, and thematic transparency in Mathieu’s work underscore his practice and deep concern to uncover the power and spiritual structures behind modes of thinking, of behaving and manifesting realities.

His paintings often re-stage archived materials such as videos and photographs to bring forth the fact of erasure, of invisibility and the consequent curiosity and questions that arise in the face of narrational voids. He explores this sensation as a collective reality of the black diaspora that historical silencing and marginalization violently imposed.

As a multidisciplinary artist, he draws from various musical practices— jazz improvisation and repetition— and material processes that allow him to expand and diversify his approach on a subject matter that he explores years on end.

Mathieu consistently refers Haitian visual cultures of religious hybridity such as in The Poto-Mitan movement, ecology, nature as it appears in other movements like Saint Soleil.

Drawings and other media
Mathieu has a website dedicated to his art: https://www.manuelmathieu.com/
Mathieu also works in drawing, textile, video and installation art. His drawings are smaller scales than his paintings. It is through his drawings that important breakthroughs happened in his painting practice.

His short films push the boundaries of conceptual narration in his perpetual study of how beliefs, and history informs our perspectives and our reactions to political and/or intimate events.

Selected exhibitions

Solo
 2020 - World Discovered Under Other Skies, The Power Plant Contemporary, Toronto, Canada
 2020 - Survivance, Montreal Museum of Fine arts, Montreal, Canada
 2019 - Wu ji, HDM Gallery, Beijing, China
 2018 - The Spell on You, Maruani Mercier, Brussels, Belgium
 2018 - Nobody is watching, Kavi Gupta Gallery, Chicago, USA
 2017 - Truth to Power, Tiwani Contemporary Gallery, London, UK 
2017 - Art Brussels, Maruani Mercier, Brussels, Belgium
 2016 - One Future, Goldsmiths Graduating Show, UK
 2012 - Prémices / Open-Ended, Montréal, arts interculturels, Montreal, Canada

Group
 2021 - La machine qui enseignait des airs aux oiseaux, Contemporary Art Museum of Montreal, Montreal, Canada
 2020 - Relations: Diaspora and Painting, Phi Foundation, Montreal, Canada
 2019 - The other side of now, Pérez Art Museum Miami, Miami, USA
 2019 - Over my Black Body, Galerie de l'UQAM, Montreal, Canada
 2018 - Arco Madrid, Maruani Mercier, Madrid, Spain
 2018 - CIRCA 2018 benefit exhibition, Montreal, Canada
 2018 - Playlist, Antoine Ertaskiran, Montreal, Canada
 2018 - Here we are here: Black contemporary Canadian artist, Montreal Museum of Fine Arts, Montreal, Canada
 2017 - We are all very anxious, Dye House 451, London, UK
 2017 - In-visibilité Ostentatoire, Fondation Clement, Martinique
 2016 - Deptford X Festival, London, UK (commissioned work)
 2016 - Will Nature Make a Man of Me Yet? PI Artworks, London, UK 
 2016 - Myth Material, TAP, London, UK
 2014 - Haïti, 2 centuries of creations, Grand Palais, Paris, France
 2014 - Consisting of superposed Layers that sometimes partially merged, POPOP Gallery, Montreal, Canada
 2014 - Les Contemporains, Artv Studio, Montreal, Canada
 2014 - Les Contemporains, Musée d'art contemporain de Montréal, Canada
 2014 - Les Ateliers TD, ARSENAL, Montreal, Canada
 2013 - In Extremis: Death and Life in 21st Century Haitian Art, Museum of Civilization Quebec City, Quebec, Canada
 2013 - On Common Ground, Art Museum of the Americas, Washington, D.C., USA
 2013 - Haïti: Radical and contemporary, Grande Finale - 2013 A.R.T Fabric, Freland France
 2012 - Haïti: Radical and contemporary, Musée du Montparnasse, Paris, France

Collections and Awards

Public and Private Collections

USA 

 The Joyner/Giuffrida Collection
 Rubell’s Family 
 JP Morgan

CANADA 

 Hydro Quebec 
 Montreal Museum of Fine Arts
 Museum of Civilization of Quebec
 National Museum of Fine Arts of Quebec

Awards 

 2015 - Fig2, United Kingdom
 2020 - Sobey Art Award, Canada

References

Living people
1986 births
Haitian painters
Haitian male painters
People from Port-au-Prince